Bar Boys is a 2017 Philippine comedy-drama film directed by Kip Oebanda under TropicFrills Film Productions in cooperation with Wild Sound Studios starring Rocco Nacino, Carlo Aquino, Enzo Pineda and Kean Cipriano.

Plot
A quarter of friends consisting of legal management graduates Christian (Enzo Pineda), Erik Visencio (Carlo Aquino), Joshua (Kean Cipriano) and Toran Garcia (Rocco Nacino), play League of Legends in an internet café and later check the results of their law school entrance examination. Of the four, only Erik, Christian, and Toran manage to pass. Joshua, on the other end, does not appear on the list due to his focus on making a career as an actor and model.

The families of the three law school passes celebrate the success of their offspring. Toran is from a middle class family of seven with parents who invite their neighbors to celebrate their children's achievements and takes the course to make a name for the family while they support his education. Erik is from a working-class family whose patriarch is an aging retired cop working as a security guard and takes the course to lift them from poverty. Christian comes from a wealthy family and has the option to attend an Ivy League university in the United States, but opts to take up law in the Philippines partly because he wants to be in close proximity with the girlfriend (Ana Luna), which his father (Pontri Bernardo), a Filipino-born American lawyer and businessman in the United States, knows little about.

The trio begin their days in law school and face different challenges and events. In their first class, the friends meet with a gay lawyer named Victor Cruz, who also fancies his students. Toran starts a relationship with a popular and beautiful intelligent girl in his class and at the same time, is invited to join an elite and well-known law school fraternity after a small altercation with a member of their rival fraternity. However, he faces a moral dilemma when he witnesses one of his fellow fraternity members abuse a neophyte, leaving him torn between reporting the offense to school authorities or preserving his status of respect in the organization. Erik's father, on the other hand, suffers a stroke and he is forced to balance his time between studying, working, and taking care of him.

After years of overcoming challenges with hard work, the trio reach their senior year wherein they tackle the most difficult cases and subjects, the most prominent of which is taught by the college's dean, retired Supreme Court Associate Justice Hernandez, known for her strict and rigid demeanor who would not accept anything other than a precise answer. In one class, Hernandez tells the students on how to succeed and why people who study law take the course seriously before speaking of a pro bono case tackling land titles and oppression of the farmers which she has handled earlier.

Months before graduation, Hernandez reveals the names of those who would graduate or not including on grade cutting to allow a specific number of students who cannot graduate to be allowed to graduate the course. Despite the risk of losing his respect within the fraternity and after a small confrontation with the Lord Master, Toran gathers courage and reports of the hazing to Hernandez, who takes immediate action. He then reunited with his friends and it is revealed that he managed to cut a portion of his grades, allowing all three friends to graduate.

During the bar examinations, Erik drops out when his father succumbs to the ailment and has him cremated, while Toran and Christian carry on. Several months later, Toran returns home to his family and pranks them into thinking that he failed the bar exams but reveals that he passed, bringing additional joy to the family, while Christian becomes a topnotcher.

Joshua later reunites with the trio when they discover Toran arguing with Erik keeping his father's ashes and Christian gives a portion of Josh's income as a sought-after actor (meant for him) to Erik. Although he refuses, Josh tells Erik to keep the money and use it for his needs. Later on, Erik and Justice Hernandez reunite and talk about their lives as well as the death of Erik's father, to which the latter gives her condolences. As Erik reveals his plan to start a business, Justice Hernandez gives him support but also motivates him to take the bar examinations again before telling of fraternity influences.

Years later, Josh is a successful and famous celebrity while Erik ranks as the ninth on the bar exam topnotchers. After Christian chats with Josh, who is preparing to film new scenes for a TV series, the former enters the courthouse library and reunites with Toran and Erik. After he and Torran reveal to Erik that they coached and reviewed him for his retake, the trio then leave for the courtroom and make themselves ready for their session.

Cast

Main characters 
Rocco Nacino as Atty. Torran Garcia
Carlo Aquino as Atty. Erik Vicencio
Enzo Pineda as Atty. Christian Carlson
Kean Cipriano as Joshua Zuniga

Law school professors 
Seb Castro as Atty Victor Cruz, a gay professor
Odette Khan as Justice Hernandez, a retired court Justice known for her strict demeanor who would not accept anything other than a specific and precise answer. The role was originally offered to Senator Miriam Defensor Santiago, to which she initially accepted only to drop out due to her 2016 presidential campaign conflicting with the production schedule.
Maey Bautista as Atty. Formilleza

Other characters 
Anna Luna as Rachel the girlfriend of Christian.
Rener Concepcion as Renato Vicencio the father of Erik.
Vance Larena as Lord Master
Irene Celebre as Linda Vicencio mother of Torran.
Pontri Bernardo as Atty. Maurice Carlson the father of Christian.
Hazel Faith Dela Cruz as Alice

Production
Bar Boys was produced under TropicFrills Film Productions in cooperation with Wild Sound Studios. It was directed and written by Kip Oebanda. The concept for the film was created when Oebanda was watching a local horror film with a lawyer friend who described to him that law school is the "ultimate horror film". Oebanda presented the idea for the film at the 2014 Film Financing Forum. This led to Oebanda researching on law schools and its culture, law students and instructors and even the concept of friendship.

He describes the film as a "love story" saying that friendship is a "form of love". He says that the characters in the film went through conflicts that made them make tough decisions and was asked to pick between friendship or personal success. The film was produced by Vanessa Ulgado.

The film received support from  the SM Foundation. Principal photography for Bar Boys was made in 2015 and additional shots were made the following year. Most of the school scenes, including the library and classrooms, were filmed in San Beda College (now San Beda University), while scenes depicting the bar operations of different law schools were actual footage of the 2015 bar examinations at the University of Santo Tomas (UST). However, as filming inside UST, the venue for the bar examinations, was prohibited for security reasons, scenes of law graduates taking the bar examinations were instead filmed in another portion of San Beda College.

Release
The film distributed by Quantum Films made its theatrical debut on August 16, 2017, as one of the twelve official entries at the 2017 Pista ng Pelikulang Pilipino.

Reception

Critical response
The Cinema Evaluation Board gave Bar Boys an "A" rating. Writer-director Erik Matti described the film as "nostalgic and sentimental", saying that Bar Boys reminded him of Maryo J. de los Reyes's Bagets and Jake Tordesillas's High School Circa '65. He also praised the performance of the lead actors as well as the "nuanced detail on the inner workings of making it to law school" as depicted in the film.

Accolades

References

External links
 

Films set in universities and colleges
Films about friendship
Philippine comedy-drama films